Pablo Andrés Andrea Mirabal (born 6 April 2001) is a Venezuelan footballer who plays as a forward for Venezuelan Primera División side LALA FC.

Career

Club career
Andrea is a product of San Fernando FC in San Fernando de Apure and Zamora. He got his professional debut for Zamora on 26 September 2018 against Metropolitanos, when he came on as a substitute for Richard Almeida with five minutes left. This was his only official appearance during his time at the club, before leaving ahead of the 2020 season to join newly promoted Venezuelan Primera División side Yaracuyanos.

Andrea got his official debut for Yaracuyanos on 1 March 2020 against Estudiantes de Mérida. On 15 April 2021, Andrea moved to LALA FC.

References

External links
 

2001 births
Living people
Association football forwards
Venezuelan footballers
Venezuelan Primera División players
Zamora FC players
Yaracuyanos FC players
People from Apure